The men's freestyle middleweight competition at the 1932 Summer Olympics in Los Angeles took place from 1 August to 3 August at the Grand Olympic Auditorium. Nations were limited to one competitor. This weight class was limited to wrestlers weighing up to 79kg.

This freestyle wrestling competition did not use the single-elimination bracket format previously used for Olympic freestyle wrestling but instead followed the format that was introduced at the 1928 Summer Olympics for Greco-Roman wrestling, using an elimination system based on the accumulation of points. Each round featured all wrestlers pairing off and wrestling one bout (with one wrestler having a bye if there were an odd number). The loser received 3 points. The winner received 1 point if the win was by decision and 0 points if the win was by fall. At the end of each round, any wrestler with at least 5 points was eliminated.

Schedule

Results

Round 1

Hess (bye) and Kotani (win by fall) advanced with 0 points. Tunyogi and Luukko each received 1 point for winning by decision. Johansson, Poilvé, and Stockton each received 3 points as losers of their bouts.

 Bouts

 Points

Round 2

The two 0-point wrestlers from the first round both lost, falling to 3 points. They were joined there by two first-round losers, Poilvé and Johansson, who won by fall in the second round. The third first-round loser, Stockton, lost again and was eliminated. Luukko moved into the lowest-points position with a bye keeping him at 1; Tunyogi had the best score among wrestlers who competed in both rounds with 2 points after a second win by decision.

 Bouts

 Points

Round 3

The lead continued to be elusive, as Luukko lost to move from 1 point to 4. The three winners in this round all ended the round with 3 points, Hess and Johansson staying there with wins by fall and Tunyogi moving from 2 points to 3 with his win by decision. Kotani and Poilvé were both eliminated.

 Bouts

 Points

Final round

With all four wrestlers at no less than 3 points, both bouts in this round would eliminate the loser. Tunyogi and Hess were the defeated wrestlers, each finishing with 6 points. Because Tunyogi had defeated Hess earlier, he was awarded the bronze medal. The winners of the round each won by fall, with Johansson staying at 3 points to Luukko's 4. As the two had already faced each other, the competition was over and Johansson took the gold medal. Johansson had lost to Luukko earlier, but won his remaining matches by fall while Luukko also had a loss (to Hess) and had received an additional point by beating Johansson by decision rather than fall.

 Bouts

 Points

References

Wrestling at the 1932 Summer Olympics